Lielvārde/Fatpipe is a Latvian Floorball League team based in Lielvārde, Latvia. For the first time the team became Latvian champions in the 2011/12 season. Title was won again in the 2015/16 and 2018/19 seasons. In 2022/23 season Lielvārde/Fatpipe and Ogres vilki teams combined under the name Lielvārde/ Fatpipe.

Goaltenders
89  Jānis Salcevičs
69  Lauris Kārkliņš
1  Raivis Puzulis

Defencemen
  4  Jānis Jāzeps Grizāns
15  Iļja Taratutins
20  Gustavs Rolands Ražinskis
21  Armands Savins
23  Kārlis Stukāns
71  Mariss Giņko
90  Klāvs Kaspars

Forwards
  2  Patriks Cinītis
  5  Didzis Nemme
  7  Niks Blumfelds
  10  Aivis Kusiņš
11  Armands Skulte
12  Maikls Nazarovs
13  Sandis Mihailovskis
14  Markuss Nazarovs
16  Kārlis Rudzītis
17  Gustavs Rudzītis
22  Edgars Ričards Gremze
27  Juris Sandis Jēgers (Captain)
30  Ralfs Fricsons
33  Oskars Tūtāns
35  Toms Emīls Jēkabsons 
93  Gustavs Gadzāns

References
FK Lielvārde official web site

Floorball in Latvia
Latvian floorball teams